Carl Reese may refer to:

 Carl Reese (American football) 
 Carl Reese (driver)